Carl Meredith Allen (1925–1994) was an American merchant marine who claimed that during World War II he witnessed the "Philadelphia Experiment", a supposed paranormal event where the United States Navy made a ship invisible and accidentally teleported it through space. The story is widely understood to be a hoax perpetrated by Allen, something he confessed to several times over the years, then recanted, then confessed to again.

Biography
Carl Allen was born on May 31, 1925, in Springdale, Pennsylvania the eldest of five children. His family described him as brilliant in school with a "fantastic mind" but also as a person who never held any particular job for long and was a drifter. He was also known as a "master leg-puller", pulling pranks on people, or to get out of work in general. In 1942 he joined the US Marine Corps but was discharged less than a year later. Allen would later claim that in 1943 he witnessed an invisibility experiment carried out by the U.S. Navy at the Philadelphia Naval Shipyard (the so-called Philadelphia Experiment), met Albert Einstein there, and for several weeks, was schooled in physics by Einstein.

During his lifetime he would use many aliases including Carlos Miguel Allende, Senor Professor and Colonel Carlos Miguel Christofero Allende, and, one time when he wrote to the rocket engineer Wernher von Braun, Dr. Karl Merditt Allenstein. He turned up in various places including Colorado, Mexico, eventually ending up in Greeley, Colorado where he died on March 5, 1994.

Connection to the Philadelphia Experiment

In late 1955 an anonymous package arrived at the U.S. Office of Naval Research (ONR). It contained a copy of Morris K. Jessup's book The Case for the UFO: Unidentified Flying Objects that was filled with handwritten notes in its margins, written with three different shades of blue ink, appearing to detail a debate among three individuals. They discussed ideas about the propulsion for flying saucers, alien races, and express concern that Jessup was too close to discovering their technology. When Jessup was invited to the Office of Naval Research a year later and shown the annotated copy of his book, he noticed the handwriting of the annotations resembled a series of letters he received from Carl Allen, who also signed some of his letters "Carlos Miguel Allende." In the letters to Jessup, Allen put forward a story of dangerous science based on unpublished theories by Albert Einstein which had been put into practice at the Philadelphia Naval Shipyard in October 1943. In Allen's account, a destroyer escort was successfully made invisible, but the ship inexplicably teleported to Norfolk, Virginia for several minutes, and then reappeared in the Philadelphia yard. The ship's crew was supposed to have suffered various side effects, including insanity, intangibility, and being "frozen" in place. When Jessup wrote back requesting more information to corroborate his story Allen said his memory would have to be recovered and referred Jessup to what seems to be a non-existent Philadelphia newspaper article that Allen claimed covered the incident.

Twelve years later Allen would say that he authored of all the annotations in order “to scare the hell out of Jessup.”

The Jessup book with Allen's scribbled commentaries gained a life of its own when the Varo Manufacturing Corporation of Garland, Texas, who did contract work for ONR, began producing mimeographed copies of the book with Allen's annotations and Allen's letters to Jessup, first a dozen and eventually 127 copies.  These copies came to be known as the "Varo edition." This became the heart of many "Philadelphia Experiment" books, documentaries, and movies to come. Over the years various writers and researchers who tried to get more information from Carl Allen found his responses elusive, or could not find him at all.

References

External links
 The Philadelphia Experiment from A–Z – A collection of images, articles, USS Eldridge’s Logs, original research, and timeline of events
 The Philadelphia Experiment by the Department of the Navy – Naval Historical Center
 PDF version of "The Case for the Unidentified Flying Object" by Morris K. Jessup – 2003 transcription of the Office of Naval Research (ONR) annotated "Varo edition", with three-color notes supposedly by Carl Allen
 Alias Carlos Allende by Robert A. Goerman – the story of Carl Meredith Allen

Urban legends
United States Merchant Mariners
1925 births
1994 deaths
People from Springdale, Pennsylvania